Unguraș is a commune in Cluj County, Transylvania, Romania. It is composed of five villages: Batin (Bátony), Daroț (Daróc), Sicfa (Székfa), Unguraș, and Valea Ungurașului (Csabaújfalu).

Geography
The commune lies on the Transylvanian Plateau, on the banks of  the river Bandău, a right tributary of the Someșul Mic.

Unguraș borders the following communes: Braniștea to the north, Nușeni to the east (both in Bistrița-Năsăud County), Sânmartin to the south, and Mintiu Gherlii and Mica to the west (the last three in Cluj County). The commune is crossed by county road DJ161D, which starts in Valea Ungurașului and ends in Dej.

The Unguraș Fortress
The  was built after the Mongol invasion of 1241–1242, and was first attested in 1269. The ruins of the fortress (listed as monument istoric) are located on top of the nearby Fortress Hill; a small monument has been placed there in 1996.

Demographics
At the 2011 census, 61.5% of inhabitants were Hungarians, 35.7% Romanians, and 1.5% Roma.

Natives
Ioan Oltean

References

Atlasul localităților județului Cluj (Cluj County Localities Atlas), Suncart Publishing House, Cluj-Napoca, 

Communes in Cluj County
Localities in Transylvania